Au cœur du stade (meaning At the Heart of the Stadium) is the fourth live album by Canadian singer Celine Dion, released by Columbia Records on 27 August 1999. It was recorded during two sold-out concerts at the Stade de France in Paris in June 1999. Dion made music history with these two concerts, becoming the first artist in history to perform for more than 90,000 spectators, with a grand total of 180,000 ticketholders over the two nights. The album features primarily French-language songs, mainly from S'il suffisait d'aimer (1998), but also includes "My Heart Will Go On" and "Let's Talk About Love". Au cœur du stade topped the charts in Francophone countries and was certified double platinum in France, platinum in Belgium and Switzerland and gold in Canada.

Content 
Au cœur du stade was recorded at the Stade de France in Saint-Denis, during two performances on 19 and 20 June 1999.

Most of the songs on this album are live versions of tracks originally recorded for S'il suffisait d'aimer. Au cœur du stade contains also some of singer's early French songs ("Ce n'était qu'un rêve", "D'amour ou d'amitié", "Mon ami m'a quittée") and few English-language tracks, including "Let's Talk About Love" and "My Heart Will Go On". 

The CD does not contain the full show. All songs can be found on the Au cœur du stade DVD, also released in 1999. Au cœur du stade was recorded during the European leg of the Let's Talk About Love Tour.

The album was promoted with "Dans un autre monde" live video.

Critical reception

AllMusic called the album "satisfying effort, and a must for fans and collectors of this singer's music".

Commercial performance
In Francophone countries Au cœur du stade was certified double platinum in France, platinum in Belgium and Switzerland, and gold in Canada.

Au cœur du stade peaked at number one for four weeks in Switzerland, for two weeks in France and one week in Belgium Wallonia and Quebec. In Belgium Flanders it peaked at number three, and in Canada at number 15. The album charted also inside top 40 in non-Francophone countries, including number 18 in Austria, number 23 in the Netherlands, and number 37 in Germany and Hungary. On the European Top 100 Albums, Au cœur du stade peaked at number nine.

Track listing

Charts

Weekly charts

Year-end charts

Certifications and sales

Release history

See also
List of number-one singles of 1999 (France)

References

External links
 

1999 live albums
Celine Dion live albums